Graham Fraser is a Canadian writer, journalist and Commissioner of Official Language.

Graham Fraser may also refer to:

 Graham Fraser (industrialist) (1846–1915), Canadian industrialist